Rud Shir or Rudshir, also known as Rudshir-e Bala, may refer to:
 Rudshir-e Bid Mohammadi
 Rudshir-e Olya
 Rudshir-e Ziranbuh